Thinusa fletcheri is a species of "sea shore genus" in the beetle family Staphylinidae. It is found in North America.

References

Further reading

 
 

Aleocharinae
Articles created by Qbugbot
Beetles described in 1906